Franklin Hudson (1864–1918) was a 19th/20th century American-born photographer and osteopath and medical author, living in Scotland.

Life

He was born in Andalusia, Alabama on 20 September 1864. His first job was as a boat pilot for Aaron Richey (founder of Port Richey, Florida).

In 1891 he moved to Paris, Texas, then working as a photographer. Here he trained as an osteopath and became one of the original members of the American Osteopathic Association in 1897.

He emigrated to Scotland in 1903. He lived at 12 Lansdowne Crescent in western Edinburgh, a large terraced Victorian townhouse.

He died of the Spanish flu on 16 November 1918. He is buried near his home, in Dean Cemetery. The simple grave describes as a pioneer of osteopathy. It lies in the south-east section of the first northern extension.

Family

In 1893 he was married to the then 16 year old Lucy Rivers Sullivan (b.1876), daughter of Knott Sullivan. She outlived him.

Publications

Osteopathic Medicine (1906)

References

1864 births
1918 deaths
People from Andalusia, Alabama
American osteopaths
Burials at the Dean Cemetery
Deaths from the Spanish flu pandemic in Scotland
Artists from Alabama